The Sangone is a torrent river in the Metropolitan City of Turin, Piedmont, north-western Italy.

Geography
Starting at some 2000 m above the sea level in the Cottian Alps, it runs through the Val Sangone, between the Val di Susa (north) and the Val Chisone (south). It subsequently flows between the comuni of Coazze and Giaveno, then near Trana, and then enters the plain of Turin.

Nature conservation
The upper course of the Sangone is home to some rare species such as the Greyling and the freshwater crayfish Austropotamobius pallipes. Part of the river is included in the inter-communal natural park called Parco Fluviale del Sangone.

Rivers of the Province of Turin
Rivers of the Alps
Rivers of Italy